The Little Falls Formation or Little Falls Dolostone is a geologic formation in New York. The unit is of Cambrian age and rests unconformably on Precambrian rock. The unit is noted as the host for the Herkimer diamonds of New York.  The unit contains stromatolites and rare brachiopod fossils.

See also

 List of fossiliferous stratigraphic units in New York

References

 

Cambrian geology of New York (state)
Cambrian southern paleotemperate deposits